The American Music Award for Favorite Album – Country has been awarded since 1974. Years reflect the year in which the awards were presented, for works released in the previous year (until 2003 onward when awards were handed out on November of the same year). The all-time winner in this category is Carrie Underwood with 6 wins; Underwood is also the only artist in the show's history to have all six consecutive albums win. Garth Brooks is the most nominated artist with 10 nominations.

Winners and nominees

1970s

1980s

1990s

2000s

2010s

2020s

Category facts

Multiple wins

 6 wins 
 Carrie Underwood
 5 wins
 Kenny Rogers
 4 wins
 Garth Brooks
 Taylor Swift

 3 wins
 Alabama
 Reba McEntire
 Tim McGraw
 Randy Travis

 2 wins
 Toby Keith
 George Strait

Multiple nominations

 10 nominations
 Garth Brooks

 9 nominations
 George Strait

 7 nominations 
 Carrie Underwood

 6 nominations
 Alabama
 Tim McGraw
 Kenny Rogers

 5 nominations
 Alan Jackson
 Waylon Jennings
 Toby Keith
 Reba McEntire
 Rascal Flatts

 4 nominations
 Jason Aldean
 Willie Nelson
 Shania Twain

 3 nominations
 Brooks & Dunn
 Luke Bryan
 Charlie Rich
 Ricky Skaggs
 Taylor Swift
 Randy Travis

 2 nominations
 Clint Black
 Kenny Chesney
 Dixie Chicks
 Florida Georgia Line
 The Judds
 Olivia Newton-John
 Dolly Parton
 Chris Stapleton

References

American Music Awards
Country music awards
Awards established in 1974
1974 establishments in the United States
Album awards